Serena Varghese (born October 10, 1981) is an American voice actress of Indian descent. She primarily does voice work in anime titles with ADV Films and Seraphim Digital. Serena and her husband Jorge Alberto Gonzalez currently live in Los Angeles, California. She is best known as the voice of Chihiro Kosaka and Lime from The World God Only Knows, Mei Sunohara from the Clannad series, Michiru from Air, Hinako from Sister Princess, Kamyuu from the Utawarerumono series, Yun Yun from Canaan, Rein Tsunomoto from Best Student Council, and Minato Kisaragi from Dream Eater Merry. In 2007, she was one of the hosts of the American Anime Awards presentation ceremony in New York Comic Con.

Filmography

Anime

References

External links
 Serena Varghese at the CrystalAcids Anime Voice Actor Database
 
 

1981 births
Living people
Actresses from Houston
American video game actresses
American voice actresses
American actresses of Indian descent
American people of Malayali descent
21st-century American women